Events from the year 1983 in Taiwan, Republic of China. This year is numbered Minguo 72 according to the official Republic of China calendar.

Incumbents
 President – Chiang Ching-kuo
 Vice President – Hsieh Tung-min
 Premier – Sun Yun-suan
 Vice Premier – Chiu Chuang-huan

Events

March
 28 March – The commissioning of first unit of Tunghsiao Power Plant in Miaoli County.

August
 8 August – The establishment of Taipei Fine Arts Museum in Zhongshan District, Taipei.

October
 31 October – The opening of Guandu Bridge which links Taipei and New Taipei.

December
 3 December – 1983 Republic of China legislative election.

Births
 8 January – Pan Tzu-hui, softball athlete
 19 January – Jane Huang, singer
 30 March – Hebe Tien, actress and singer
 22 April – Chang Chia-che, long-distance running athlete
 12 May – Ho Ming-tsan, football player
 31 May – Michelle Chen, actress and singer
 10 June – Hsueh Shih-ling, actor, rapper, songwriter and television presenter
 11 July – Christine Kuo, actress
 27 August – Chen Bolin, actor
 6 September – Jing Chang, singer
 20 September
 Shone An, singer and actor
 A-Lin, singer and lyricist
 8 October – Maggie Wu, model and actress
 11 October – Wu Hsiao-li, volleyball player
 31 October – Jay Shih, actor, singer and TV host
 2 December – Monica Yin, actress
 28 November – Alien Huang, singer and actor
 25 December – Gwei Lun-mei actress
 28 December – Joseph Chang, actor

Deaths
 30 June – Hsu Shih-hsien, 75, former Mayor of Chiayi City.

References

 
Years of the 20th century in Taiwan